Sir George Louis Goudie (30 April 1866 – 30 April 1949) was an Australian politician.

He was born at Homebush to schoolteacher George Goudie and Caroline Ashton. After attending state schools he acquired a farm at Birchip, and from 1904 also had a share in storekeeping firms. From 1895 to 1910 he served on Birchip Shire Council, with two terms as president from 1898 to 1899 and from 1907 to 1908. On 9 September 1890 he married Alice Maud Watson, with whom he had five sons. In 1910 he moved to Egerton, serving on Ballan Shire Council from 1914 to 1916, when he moved to Hopetoun. From 1917 to 1922 he served on Karkarooc Shire Council. In 1919 he was elected to the Victorian Legislative Council for North Western Province; he was the first representative of the Victorian Farmers' Union, soon to become the Country Party, in that body. In 1923 he was appointed Minister of Public Works and Mines, a post he held until March 1924 and again from November 1924 to 1927. He was Minister of Water Supply from 1932 to 1935, Minister for Labour from 1932 to 1934, Minister of Electrical Undertakings from 1934 to 1935 and Minister of Public Works and Immigration from 1935 to 1943. Knighted in 1939, he led the government in the upper house from 1942 to 1943. Goudie died in 1949 at Elsternwick.

References

1866 births
1949 deaths
National Party of Australia members of the Parliament of Victoria
Members of the Victorian Legislative Council
Australian Knights Bachelor